Rolandas Karčemarskas (born 7 September 1980 in Latvia) is a former Lithuanian footballer, who last played for FK Jelgava. He also played for Bucheon SK of the South Korean K League.

Club career
He played for Jeju United of the South Korean K League, then known as Bucheon SK.

References

External links
 Futbolinis.lt
 
 
 
 

Lithuanian footballers
1980 births
Living people
Lithuania international footballers
K League 1 players
Jeju United FC players
Lithuanian expatriate footballers
Expatriate footballers in Lithuania
Expatriate footballers in South Korea
Association football forwards